Philip of Anjou or Philip V of Spain (1683–1746) was a king of Spain.

Philip of Anjou may also refer to:
Philip of Sicily (1255/56 – 1277), second son of King Charles of Sicily
Philip I, Prince of Taranto (1278–1331)
Philip II, Prince of Taranto (1329–1373)
Philip, Despot of Romania (d. 1331)